Helsinki Roller Derby is a women's flat track roller derby league based in Helsinki in Finland. Founded in 2009, the league currently consists of three travel teams who compete against teams from other leagues. Helsinki Roller Derby is a member of the Women's Flat Track Derby Association (WFTDA).

As of 2010, the league's skaters included Annabel Apocalipstick, Estrogeena Davis, Renée Hellweger and Bananaspit.  Eleven of their skaters were selected for Team Finland at the 2011 Roller Derby World Cup.

WFTDA competition
The league was accepted into the Women's Flat Track Derby Association Apprentice program in July 2011,  and it became a full member of the WFTDA in September 2012.  In September 2011, Helsinki competed in the Battle of the Nordic Light, the first roller derby tournament in Scandinavia.

During 2013, Helsinki played in the first Suomi Cup of roller derby, taking second place in the tournament after losing narrowly to Kallio Rolling Rainbow in the final.

In 2015, Helsinki qualified for the WFTDA Division 1 Playoffs for the first time, traveling to Omaha, Nebraska for the tournament in October, where they finished seventh by defeating Buffalo, New York's Queen City Roller Girls, 274-199. In 2016, Helsinki returned to Division 1 Playoffs, entering the Madison tournament as the sixth seed, and finishing in sixth place. As the fifth seed at the 2017 Division 1 Playoff in Malmö, Helsinki won their opening game against Charm City Roller Girls 308-144, but then lost their quarterfinal against the host Crime City Rollers 215-170. Helsinki finished their weekend with a consolation bracket victory over Calgary Roller Derby Association, 365-107. In 2018, Helsinki competed at the WFTDA Playoff in A Coruña, Spain, finishing their weekend in the consolation round with a 208-172 loss to 2×4 Roller Derby.

Rankings

 CR = consolation round

References

Roller derby leagues in Finland
Roller derby leagues established in 2009
Sports competitions in Helsinki
Women's Flat Track Derby Association Division 1
Women's sport in Finland
2009 establishments in Finland
Women's sports leagues in Finland